Hugh Bigod ( – 18 February 1225) was a member of the powerful early Norman Bigod family and was for a short time the 3rd Earl of Norfolk.

Origins
 He was born c. 1182, the eldest son of Roger Bigod, 2nd Earl of Norfolk by his wife Ida de Tosny.

Career 

In 1215, he was one of the twenty-five sureties of Magna Carta of King John. He succeeded to his father’s estates (including Framlingham Castle) in 1221.

Marriage and children

In late 1206 or early 1207, Hugh married Maud Marshal (1192 – 27 March 1248), daughter of William Marshal, 1st Earl of Pembroke (1147–1219), Marshal of England, by his wife Isabel de Clare, 4th Countess of Pembroke. They had four, or possibly five, children: 
 Roger Bigod, 4th Earl of Norfolk (–1270), died childless.
 Hugh Bigod (1211–1266), Justiciar of England. Married Joan de Stuteville, by whom he had issue.
 Isabel Bigod (c. 1212–1250), married twice: Firstly to Gilbert de Lacy (son of Walter de Lacy, Lord of Meath and his wife Margaret de Braose), by whom she had issue; Secondly to John FitzGeoffrey, Lord of Shere, Justiciar of Ireland, by whom she had issue, including Maud FitzJohn, and Joan FitzJohn who married Theobald le Botiller, and from whom descended the Irish Earls of Ormond.
 Ralph Bigod (born c. 1215)

Contrary to the assertion of Frederick Lewis Weis, Ancestral Roots, there is no evidence for a fourth son called Simon Bigod. A man of that name appears as a witness to one of Earl Hugh's charters (Morris, HBII 2), but as the eighteenth name in a list of twenty, suggesting no close connection to the main branch of the family. He is also named among the knights who surrendered to King John at Framlingham Castle in 1216. He was probably a descendant of Hugh or William Bigod, half-brothers to Earl Roger II Bigod.

Simon is recognized as the third son of Hugh Bigod in Francis Blomefield's "North Erpingham Hundred: Felbrigg", An Essay Towards A Topographical History of the County of Norfolk: Volume 8 (London, 1808), pp. 107–119. British History Online Profile, british-history.ac.uk. Accessed 2 June 2019.</ref> He is also recognized by Gary Boyd Roberts in The Royal Descents of 600 Immigrants to the American Colonies or the United States, Vol 1, p. 528.

Death
Hugh died on 18 February 1225. Very soon after Hugh's death, his widow Maud remarried William de Warenne, 5th Earl of Surrey.

Hugh Bigod in fiction
Hugh Bigod and his wife [Mahelt] are the main characters in Elizabeth Chadwick's To Defy a King. They also appear as secondary characters in novels chronicling their parents such as The Time of Singing (UK: Sphere, 2008) published in the USA as For the King's Favor; The Greatest Knight; and The Scarlet Lion.

Ancestry

References

 M. Morris, The Bigod Earls of Norfolk in the Thirteenth Century (Woodbridge, 2005)

1180s births
1225 deaths
3rd Earl of Norfolk
Hugh
Norfolk